Munnuru  is a village in the southern state of Karnataka, India. It is located in the Bantwal taluk of Dakshina Kannada district in Karnataka.

Demographics
 India census, Munnuru had a population of 7789 with 3842 males and 3947 females.

See also
 Mangalore
 Districts of Karnataka

References

External links
 http://dk.nic.in/

Villages in Dakshina Kannada district